Simon Patrick Mackin (born 1 September 1992) is an Australian cricketer who debuted for Western Australia during the 2013–14 season.

Mackin was born in Wyalkatchem, a small country town in the Wheatbelt region of Western Australia, and raised nearby in Tammin. At the conclusion of the 2012–13 season, following good form for Willetton at grade level, Mackin was named the WA Cricket Media Guild's Player of the Future. He subsequently received a rookie contract from the Western Australian Cricket Association (WACA) for the 2013–14 season.

In November 2013, Mackin played a match for a Cricket Australia Chairman's XI against the touring English team at Traeger Park, Alice Springs, after two other bowlers (Alister McDermott and Kane Richardson) withdrew. He made his first-class debut shortly after, taking two wickets in a Sheffield Shield game against Queensland. Mackin's height and bowling ability have led to him being compared to Jo Angel, who holds the record for the most first-class wickets taken for Western Australia.

After taking 39 wickets in his first 13 first-class matches, he then took 23 in his next two, in the Sheffield Shield in 2016-17: 5 for 68 and 6 for 33 against Queensland, and 7 for 81 and 5 for 78 against South Australia. Western Australia won both matches.

References

External links

Simon Mackin at Cricket.com.au

1992 births
Australian cricketers
Cricketers from Western Australia
Living people
People from Wyalkatchem, Western Australia
Western Australia cricketers